This is the discography of American R&B/soul vocal group Harold Melvin & the Blue Notes.

Albums

Studio albums

Compilation albums

Singles

Other appearances

References

External links
 

Rhythm and blues discographies
Discographies of American artists